A by-election was held for the New South Wales Legislative Assembly seat of Davidson on 2 May 1992.

It was triggered by the resignation of former Liberal Party-turned Independent MP, Terry Metherell, after the scandal known as the 'Metherell Crisis'.

The seat was subsequently won by Andrew Humpherson of the Liberal Party. However the Liberals suffered a 16% drop in their primary vote, and a 14% drop in their two party preferred vote.

Background

The seat of Davidson, a traditionally safe Liberal seat, was held since 1981 by Dr Terry Metherell, a controversial Minister for Education in the first term of the Greiner government.

Charges of tax avoidance forced his resignation from the Ministry in 1990. However, there was speculation that he would be re-appointed to the ministry when the Greiner government was re-elected in 1991. However, at the 1991 election, the Greiner government lost its majority, and was forced to depend on the support of the four independents in order to stay in office. This all but squashed any chance of Metherell returning to cabinet. Feeling betrayed and rejected from his party, Metherell resigned from the Liberal Party in October 1991 live on the 7:30 Report, without having given his colleagues notice.

The government subsequently created a job for Metherell, a position with the Environment Protection Agency. He accepted and duly resigned from state parliament, effectively engineering a vacancy in a seat that was very likely to revert to the Liberas in a by-election. Labor did not nominate a candidate, but a field of Independents and minor parties reduced the Liberal vote by 16%, and 14% after preferences.

Results
The Liberal Party retained the seat, despite a swing of 16%. The Liberal candidate, Warringah Councillor since 1985, Andrew Humpherson, was declared the winner against Independent Candidate and Warringah Councillor since 1980, Julie Sutton.

Nonetheless, the circumstances of Metherell's appointment to the EPA ultimately forced Greiner out of politics a few months after the by-election, when the ICAC determined Metherell's appointment had been corrupt and the independents threatened to bring down the government unless Greiner resigned.

Terry Metherell, -turned  resigned.

See also
Electoral results for the district of Davidson
List of New South Wales state by-elections

References

New South Wales state by-elections
1992 elections in Australia
1990s in New South Wales